Rambod Javan (born 22 December 1971) is an Iranian actor, director, TV host and the author of many screenplays. Rambod Javan has made and directed a locally famous TV program, Khandevane. Khandevane has so far had 8 successful seasons.

Career
Javan began stage acting in 1991.

Three years later, he came into the spotlight with a short role in The Spouses (1995) series and found fame after appearing in the series The Green House (1995).

He is more known as a comedic actor.

In 2002, he directed his first series, Lost, which was broadcast during the fasting month of Ramadan and was well received by both viewers and critics.

Rambod made his film-directing debut with Spaghetti in 8 minutes (2005) and received a Fajr International Film Festival Phoenix for Best Actor in a Supporting Role for Sinners (2012).

The diverse roles he took on in Mummy 3 (1999) and A Place of Love (2000) established him as a versatile actor.

Many critics, however, believe Pink (2003) was the apex of his acting career. He was nominated for a Fajr International Film Festival Crystal Phoenix for Best Actor for Pink.

Rambod has appeared in many other series and movies, including Born Again (1997), Help Me (1997), The Magic Coat (1998), Maxx (2004), Souvenir from Abroad (2006), The Music Box (2007), Adam's Son, Eve's Daughter (2009), No Men Allowed (2009), The Lab (2011), and Conditional Release (2013).

Javan appeared in an episode of the popular TV series, The Spouses. He also appeared in the television series, The Green House, playing the humorous character Farid Sabahi.

Rambod Javan is the son of two Iranian Azerbaijanis parents. He had a brief marriage with Mandana Rouhi until their divorce some years later. Javan remarried Iranian actress Sahar Dolatshahi in 2008, they divorced in 2014.

Filmography

Television series

Film

Variety shows

Awards and nominations

References

External links
 

 
 Rambod Javan in Internet database of Soureh Cinema

Living people
Iranian Azerbaijanis
Iranian male stage actors
Iranian comedians
Iranian film directors
Iranian male television actors
1971 births
Male actors from Tehran
Iranian stand-up comedians
Iranian television talk show hosts
Iranian radio and television presenters
Crystal Simorgh for Best Supporting Actor winners